North Church or North Parish Church or variations may refer to:

Church buildings
Netherlands
 The Noorderkerk in Amsterdam, The Netherlands, also known as North Church

Russia
 North Church (Alania), in Arkhyz, Karachay-Cherkessia

United States

(by state)
 Old North Church (Sierra Madre, California)
 Old North Church in Boston, Massachusetts
 St. Stephen's Church, Boston, formerly New North Church, in Boston, Massachusetts
 North Parish Church (North Andover, Massachusetts)
 North Church, in Tupelo, Mississippi, whose North Church Primary School is listed on the NRHP in Mississippi
 North Church (Portsmouth, New Hampshire)
 North Church (Dumont, New Jersey), listed on the NRHP in New Jersey

Religious denominations
Danish Evangelical Lutheran Church in North America (also known as North Church), which merged in 1896 with the Danish Evangelical Lutheran Association in America to form the United Danish Evangelical Lutheran Church